Kia may be:
the Zabana language of the Solomon Islands
the Jair language of New Guinea, from the name of a language survey